Pinkett is a surname. Notable people with the surname include:

Allen Pinkett (born 1964), former professional American football player
Eric Pinkett (1911–1979), the founder of the Leicestershire Schools Symphony Orchestra
Harold T. Pinkett (1914–2001), the first African-American archivist employed at the National Archives of the United States
Jada Pinkett Smith (born 1971), American actress, producer, director, author, singer-songwriter, businesswoman, the wife of Will Smith and the mother of Jaden Smith and Willow Smith
Mary Pinkett, the first black New York City councilwoman
Randal Pinkett (born 1971), business consultant who was 2005 winner of The Apprentice
Ward Pinkett (1906–1937), American jazz trumpeter